Bonnard is both a surname and a given name. Notable people with the name include:

 Abel Bonnard (1883–1968), French poet, novelist and politician
  (18881959), Swiss scholar and translator of classical Greek
 Jean-Louis Bonnard (1824–1852), French Roman Catholic missionary
 Marie Bonnard du Parquet (died 1659), wife of Jacques Dyel du Parquet, one of the first governors of Martinique
 Mario Bonnard (1889–1965), Italian actor and film director
 Michelle Bonnard (born 1980), English actress
 Pierre Bonnard (1867–1947), French artist
 Bonnard J. Teegarden, American astrophysicist

Fictional characters:
 The Bonnards, a fictional family in the film The Happy Time and related works based on the stories of Robert Fontaine

See also
 Bonnard, Yonne, a French commune